Schmerling is a German surname. Notable people with the surname include:

Anton von Schmerling (1805–1893), Austrian statesman
Philippe-Charles Schmerling (1791–1836), Dutch/Belgian historian, paleontologist and geologist
Rene Schmerling (1901–1967), Georgian art historian and art critic

See also
Anna Pessiak-Schmerling (1834–1896), Austrian composer

German-language surnames